Stonyhurst Southville International School is a learning institution in the province of Batangas and one of the SGEN (Southville Global Education Network) schools.

History 
SSIS started off in 1996 offering only a Pre-school program as Stonyhurst School and integrating an English speaking environment. The name being reference to Stonyhurst College in the UK, the school where Peter P. Laurel, the founder of the school, studied.

In 1997, the grade school department opened with an Integrated Program, a developmental model for elementary schools, designed to better meet the challenges of the 21st century. This opened the doors of SSIS, at that time still Stonyhurst School, to more and older students. This allowed the school to expand its grounds and start constructing other school facilities like the gym and the cafeteria.

In 2005, Stonyhurst took a higher dimension when it was granted by the Securities and Exchange Commission, upon recommendation of the Department of Education, the international status thus the name, Stonyhurst International School. The year after, it merged with one of the leading international schools in the country, Southville International School and Colleges, a school recognized nationally and internationally, which also paved way to building its second campus in Lipa City - Stonyhurst Southville International School - Malarayat / Lipa City Campus.

In 2009, The Western Association of Schools and Colleges (WASC, USA) granted Stonyhurst Southville International School full accreditation.

It has continued to develop its curriculum incorporating Financial Literacy, Business and Entrepreneurship Subjects, Foreign Language in its program.

In 2017, the school added robotics in its pre-school, grade school, and high school curriculum and integrated a robotics lab making use of robotic programs involving Hexbots and Arduino.

School campuses

Stonyhurst Southville - Batangas City Campus

Stonyhurst Southville - Malarayat/Lipa City Campus 
Stonyhurst Southville International School – Malarayat (SSISM) was established in 2007 due to the strong demand for international education in the city of Lipa; and the increasing number of clients coming from the city and its nearby towns.

Originally situated in a small house with a population of only 44 students, SSISM has grown to more than 500 students.

International curriculum

Early Childhood Education Department 
The Early Childhood Education Department (ECED) of SSIS Malarayat serves learners from Nursery (2 years old), Pre-Kinder (3 years old), Junior Kinder (4 years old), Senior Kinder (5 years old), Grade 1 (6 years old) and Grade 2 (7 years old).

Curriculum and academic programs

Early Childhood Education Department’s curriculum is patterned after Pennsylvania Standards.

Grade School Department 
The SSIS Grade School (GS) Department consists of students from the 3rd, 4th, 5th and 6th Grades. In Grade School, students deepen their understanding of the different academic areas.  The development of physical, emotional, social and functional skills are also highlighted in the GS program.  Aside from the academic subjects – Math, Science, English, Social Studies, Languages, there are also courses on Arts, Culture and Sports - Physical Education, Values Education, Home Economics, Technology, Robotics, Financial Literacy, Football and Interest Clubs.

Curriculum and academic programs
SSIS Grade School Department is generally patterned after the Common Core State Standards for English, UK Standards for Mathematics and Science, and NCTM (National Council of Teacher of Math). It applies WASC Focus on Learning called Expected Schoolwide Learning Results (ESLRs).  For teaching methodologies, Grade School Department of SSIS uses innovative learning technology and effective approaches in teaching such as Brain-based Learning, Differentiated Curriculum, Instruction and Assessment (D.C.I.A.), Positive Learning Environment through Discipline (P.L.E.D.), and Understanding By Design (U.B.D.).

Curriculum and academic programs
SSIS High School Department is patterned after the Common Core State Standards for English, UK Standards for Mathematics and Science, and NCTM (National Council of Teacher of Math). It applies WASC Focus on Learning called Expected Schoolwide Learning Results (ESLRs).  For teaching methodologies, High School Department of SSIS uses innovative learning technology and effective approaches in teaching such as Brain-based Learning, Differentiated Curriculum, Instruction and Assessment (D.C.I.A.), Positive Learning Environment through Discipline (P.L.E.D.), and Understanding By Design (U.B.D.).

Aside from the courses in Mathematics, English, Science, Social Living and Global Education, Filipino, Home Economics and Technological Arts, Computer/Robotics, Music, Arts, Physical Education and Foreign Language (which are also offered in the Grade School Department), the High School Department also offers courses on Economics, Accounting, Investment Management & Entrepreneurship and Financial Literacy.

Senior High School Department 
Senior High School (SHS) covers the last two years of the K-12 Program in accordance to the Republic Act No. 10533, also known as the Enhanced Basic Education Act. SSIS follows the core curriculum and subjects under the track of their choice. SSIS also incorporates the international standards in English, Math, and Science courses.

Curriculum and academic programs
The Senior High School of SSIS Malarayat offers the STEM and the ABM Strands.  STEM stands for Science, Technology, Engineering and Mathematics; while ABM stands for Accountancy, Business and Management.  Below is the list of courses offered for each strand.

SCIENCE, TECHNOLOGY, ENGINEERING, AND MATHEMATICS STRAND (S.T.E.M.).  This strand focuses on University and College courses such as Chemical Engineering, Electrical Engineering, Industrial Engineering, Computer Engineering, Safety Engineering, Civil Engineering, Marine Engineering, Information Technology, Computer Programming, Data Encoding, Data Analyzing, Pre-Medical Courses, Doctor of Medicine, Doctor of Dental Medicine, Nursing, Medical Technology, Radiologic Technology, Phlebotomy, Pharmacy, Chemical Science, Biological Science, Physical Science, Organic Chemistry and the like.  Specialized Subjects that are included under this strand are Chemistry 1 & 2, Biology 1&2, Practical Research, Pre-Calculus, Calculus, Business Math, Physics 1 & 2.

ACCOUNTANCY, BUSINESS, AND MANAGEMENT STRAND (ABM).  This strand focuses on University and College courses such as Accountancy, Entrepreneurship, Business Management, Marketing and the like. Specialized Subjects that are included under this strand are Business Ethics and Social Responsibility, Marketing, Business Organization and Environment, Business Math, Economics, Finance and Accounts, Business Plan, Practical Research.

Affiliates 

Stonyhurst Southville International School is a member of the Southville Global Education Network (SGEN), and is affiliated with its following sister schools:

Southville International School affiliated with Foreign Universities (SISFU)
Southville International School and Colleges
South Mansfield College
South SEED LPDH College

References

Schools in Batangas City
International schools in the Philippines
Educational institutions established in 1996
1996 establishments in the Philippines